Dieter Hoeneß (born 7 January 1953) is a German former professional football player and executive. A forward in his playing career, Hoeneß was mainly associated with Bayern Munich. After retiring, he stayed connected with football, working extensively in directorial capacities for several clubs. Hoeneß represented West Germany at the 1986 World Cup.

Club career 
Born in Ulm, West Germany, Hoeneß played from age six to fourteen as a goalkeeper on amateur level for VfB Ulm, which was co-founded by his father, the master butcher Erwin Hoeneß on 13 November 1949. The team won the 1960/61 season – together with his brother Uli – the 1st districts championship in the D–Youth. From 1967 to 1973 Hoeneß played for TSG Ulm 1846. In 1973, at the age of 20, he moved to VfR Aalen in the first amateur league (third division), before he moved to the professionals in 1975 with VfB Stuttgart, with the club then in the second division. In his first season he won the championship and with 23 goals was the second best scorer for the Aaleners behind Helmut Dietterle. Because of the league reform, in which the five-track Regionalliga was replaced by the two-track 2. Bundesliga as the second highest division, the VfR could not be promoted and also entered the third division in the following season. There Hoeneß was able to reach the championship again with the team but failed in the promotion games. In 1975 the second division club VfB Stuttgart signed him, where he made his debut on 13 September 1975 (7th matchday) in the 0-2 home defeat against 1. FSV Mainz 05; he scored his first goal on 15 October (matchday11) in a 2-0 home win over SV Röchling Völklingen. After two seasons and 19 league goals, he promoted to the Bundesliga. Hoeneß made his debut there on 6 August 1977 (Day 1) in a tenses 3-3 win against his future club, FC Bayern Munich. With the interim 1-1 in the 1-2 defeat in the home game against Hamburger SV on 31 August (5th matchday), he also scored his first goal in the top division.

After the 1978–79 season, where he scored 16 goals to help Stuttgart finish in second place, Hoeneß signed with FC Bayern Munich. There, he was highly successful both individually and collectively, winning five leagues and three cups. A powerful striker whose main strength was his heading ability, he scored five times in double digits during his stint with the Bavarians, for a total of 127 goals in 288 league matches, in the German top division alone; he retired in 1987, at 34.  In 224 Bundesliga games he scored 102 goals and scored statistically in every second European Cup game (26 goals in 52 appearances) for Bayern Munich. He took the team to the semi-finals of the 1980 UEFA Europa League, finishing ass the competition’s top scorer with seven goals. In 1982 he lost to Aston Villa in the final of the European Cup and was top scorer again with seven goals. During his time in Munich, the centre forward was feared because of his goal threat. Heading goals was his specialty and he was also considered a natural fighter. He reinforced this reputation when he played on in the 1982 DFB-Pokal final after a collision with 1. FC Nürnberg player Alois Reinhard despite a laceration on his head with a turban-like bandage for almost an hour and finally made it 4-2 in the 89th minute scored with a head. On 25 February 1984, he scored five goals in a row in 21 minutes in a 6-0 home win over Bayern Munich. His 58th and last match in the European cup competitions in his final season 1986–87 was the defeat in Champions' Cup Final against FC Porto.

International career 

On 28 March 1979, Hoeneß played his first international match in the jersey of the B national team, which defeated the senior national team of  Norway 3-0 in Aachen, where he contributed a goal. Also in his second game in this national team, on 19 December 1979 in Genoa, he contributed with a goal in the 2-1 victory over the B selection of Italy.

Hoeneß played six times for West Germany, scoring four goals. He scored on his debut with the Republic of Ireland on 22 May 1979, repeating the feat the following month, in Iceland (both matches were away friendlies that ended with 3–1 wins).

Hoeneß then spent seven years without a callup. However, after a solid season with Bayern – 15 league goals, winning the double – the veteran was picked for the squad that took part in the 1986 FIFA World Cup in Mexico, where he played twice for the eventual runners-up; one of those appearances came in the final against Argentina, where he replaced Felix Magath at the hour-mark, obtaining the distinction of being the oldest player on the field, at 33 years and 173 days. He was called up by team boss Franz Beckenbauer for the game against Switzerland in Basel on 9 April 1986 and he scored the "golden" goal. In the subsequent 1-1 draw with Yugoslavia on 11 May in Bochum, he failed to score in an international match for the first.

Post-retirement 
After retiring from active play, Hoeneß first took on a position as PR manager with computer manufacturers Commodore International, which were then a major sponsor of Bayern Munich. In October, he took up his new position as head of sports marketing at the company, which at the time he dominated the German market for home computers. He was responsible for the expiry of the sponsorship agreement with the record champions in 1989 and, due to strategic reorientation of the company, for focusing on other sports such as equestrianism, golf, tennis and alpine skiing and in the direction of event marketing. Between 1990 and 1995 he worked as commercial/general manager with his first club, Stuttgart. It was part of a professionalization strategy that included Daimler board spokesman Matthias Kleinert as a member of the VfB executive committee. The Swabian club won the league title in the 1991/92 season but missed out on the following season due to a "mistake" – coach Christoph Daum used four foreign players without justification after Jovica Simanić was substituted on in the second leg at Leeds United – after a 1-2 defeat in decider at Camp Nou in the first round of the 1992/93 UEFA Champions League, the group stage of the inaugural European Cup. In the following years the club could no longer build on the success. In the spring of. 1995, the sporting management in the form of Hoeneß was also accused of not fitting his Anglo-Saxon vocabulary such as "event", "marketing" and "merchandising" to Swabian down-to-earthness and he came to work late in the morning. Hoeneß' successor became his predecessor, the managing director Ulrich Schäfer, who was in office between 1976. And 1990, took over the operational skills of association again.

In November 1995, Michael A. Roth, the president of 1. FC Nürnberg, campaigned massively for Hoeneß' commitment but was unable to assert him in the club, in order for Hoeneß to accept the offer to take over post of general manager of a TV company. In April 1997, Hoeneß ended his commitment to the TV company and Hoeneß became vice-president of another Bundesliga outfit, Hertha BSC after acting as substitute for the dismissed Carl-Heinz Rühl since March. After the club's promotion to the Bundesliga in the summer of that year, the team subsequently established itself in the top flight and qualified seven times in twelve seasons under Hoeneß' leadership to take part in an international cup. The team was in the top 6 in the league eight times during this period. Shortly after, he switched to commercial/general manager, and was released on 7 June 2009. He was released on 7 June 2009 at his own request, one year before the end of his contract, after disagreements over his management style.

On 21 December 2009, Hoeneß was announced as new general manager at VfL Wolfsburg, taking office on 15 January 2010. After Felix Magath's return to the club, his contract was cancelled on 17 March 2011.

Personal life 
Hoeneß attended the Schubart Gymnasium in Ulm and passed the Abitur there in 1972. In Tübingen he began studying to become a teacher in the subjects English, geography and sports. As a city sponsor of his hometown of Ulm, Hoeneß supported the social project We help Africa for the 2010 FIFA World Cup in South Africa. He is an ambassador for the initiative Respect! No place for racism. After his career as Bundesliga manager, Hoeneß moved back to Munich, where he founded a consulting company in 2012. Hoeneß's older brother, Uli, was also a successful forward in the Bundesliga, also representing his country internationally. Dieter arrived at Bayern Munich as his brother departed, and Uli went on to also have a lengthy career as a general manager/club president. Both enjoy playing golf in their leisure time. Dieter's son, Sebastian Hoeneß, is a former footballer and current manager. He played for the U19s of Vfb Stuttgart, TSG 1899 Hoffenheim and the second team of Hertha BSC, among others. In Berlin, Sebastian was captain of the U-23 team. From June 2019, after several positions as a youth coach, he was head coach of the newly promoted third division FC Bayern Munich II, with whom he immediately became third division champion. From July 2020 until the end of the 2021/22 season he was head coach of TSG 1899 Hoffenheim in the Bundesliga.

Honours 

As a player
Bayern Munich
 Bundesliga: 1979–80, 1980–81, 1984–85, 1985–86, 1986–87
 DFB-Pokal: 1981–82, 1983–84, 1985–86; runner-up 1984–85
 European Cup: runner-up 1981–82, 1986–87

Individual
 Top scorer of the DFB-Pokal: 1979
 Top scorer of the Europa League: 1980
 Top scorer of the UEFA Champions League: 1982

Germany
 FIFA World Cup: runner-up 1986

As a manager
 Bundesliga: 1992
 DFL-Supercup winner: 1992
 DFL-Ligapokal winners: 2001, 2002

References

External links 
 
 
 

1953 births
Living people
Sportspeople from Ulm
German footballers
Association football forwards
Bundesliga players
2. Bundesliga players
VfB Stuttgart players
FC Bayern Munich footballers
Germany international footballers
Germany B international footballers
1986 FIFA World Cup players
UEFA Champions League top scorers
Footballers from Baden-Württemberg
West German footballers